Pierre Paul Henri Gaston Doumergue (1 August 1863 in Aigues-Vives, Gard18 June 1937 in Aigues-Vives) was a French politician of the Third Republic. He served as President of France from 13 June 1924 to 13 June 1931.

Biography

Doumergue came from a Protestant family and was a Freemason. Beginning as a Radical, he turned more towards the political right in his old age. He served as prime minister from 9 December 1913 to 2 June 1914. He held the portfolio for the colonies through the ministries of René Viviani and Aristide Briand from 26 August 1914 to 19 March 1917. In February 1917 he was sent on a mission to Russia and negotiated with Tsar Nicholas II a secret agreement which defined the demands that France and Russia would make in future peace negotiations with Germany and Austria-Hungary. He was elected as the 13th French President on 13 June 1924, the only Protestant to hold that office. He served until 13 June 1931 and again was Prime Minister in a conservative national unity government, after the riots of 6 February 1934. That government lasted from 6 February to 8 November 1934.

He was widely regarded as one of the most popular French presidents, particularly after the controversial Alexandre Millerand, who had been his predecessor. Doumergue was single when he was elected and became the first President of France to marry in office.

Doumergue died at Aigues-Vives on 18 June, 1937 at the age of 73.

Doumergue's First Ministry, 9 December 1913 – 9 June 1914
 Gaston Doumergue – President of the Council and Minister of Foreign Affairs
 Joseph Noulens – Minister of War
 René Renoult – Minister of the Interior
 Joseph Caillaux – Minister of Finance
 Albert Métin – Minister of Labour and Social Security Provisions
 Jean-Baptiste Bienvenu-Martin – Minister of Justice
 Ernest Monis – Minister of the Marine
 René Viviani – Minister of Public Instruction and Fine Arts
 Maurice Raynaud – Minister of Agriculture
 Albert Lebrun – Minister of Colonies
 Fernand David – Minister of Public Works
 Louis Malvy – Minister of Commerce, Industry, Posts, and Telegraphs

Changes
 17 March 1914 – René Renoult succeeds Caillaux as Finance Minister.  Louis Malvy succeeds Renoult as Minister of the Interior.  Raoul Péret succeeds Malvy as Minister of Commerce, Industry, Posts, and Telegraphs.
 20 March 1914 – Armand Gauthier de l'Aude succeeds Monis as Minister of Marine.

Doumergue's Second Ministry, 9 February – 8 November 1934

 Gaston Doumergue – President of the Council
 Louis Barthou – Minister of Foreign Affairs
Philippe Pétain – Minister of War
Albert Sarraut – Minister of the Interior
Louis Germain-Martin – Minister of Finance
Adrien Marquet – Minister of Labour
Henri Chéron – Minister of Justice
François Piétri – Minister of Military Marine
William Bertrand – Minister of Merchant Marine
Victor Denain – Minister of Air
Aimé Berthod – Minister of National Education
Georges Rivollet – Minister of Pensions
Henri Queuille – Minister of Agriculture
Pierre Laval – Minister of Colonies
Pierre Étienne Flandin – Minister of Public Works
Louis Marin – Minister of Public Health and Physical Education
André Mallarmé – Minister of Posts, Telegraphs, and Telephones
Lucien Lamoureux – Minister of Commerce and Industry
Édouard Herriot – Minister of State
André Tardieu – Minister of State

Changes
13 October 1934 – Pierre Laval succeeds Barthou (assassinated 9 October) as Minister of Foreign Affairs.  Paul Marchandeau succeeds Sarraut as Minister of the Interior.  Louis Rollin succeeds Laval as Minister of Colonies.
15 October 1934 – Henri Lémery succeeds Chéron as Minister of Justice.

See also
 Interwar France
 6 February 1934 crisis
 List of covers of Time magazine (1920s) – 21 July 1924 and 2 August 1926

References

External links

1927 clip of Gaston Doumergue receiving his honorary degree from Oxford
 

1863 births
1937 deaths
20th-century presidents of France
20th-century Princes of Andorra
People from Gard
French Protestants
Politicians from Occitania (administrative region)
Radical Party (France) politicians
Prime Ministers of France
French Ministers of Commerce and Industry
French Ministers of Overseas France
Members of the 6th Chamber of Deputies of the French Third Republic
Members of the 7th Chamber of Deputies of the French Third Republic
Members of the 8th Chamber of Deputies of the French Third Republic
Members of the 9th Chamber of Deputies of the French Third Republic
French Senators of the Third Republic
Senators of Gard
Presidents of the Senate (France)
French Freemasons
Knights of the Golden Fleece of Spain
Recipients of the Order of the White Eagle (Poland)